Money laundering is the process of illegally concealing the origin of money, obtained from illicit activities such as drug trafficking, corruption, embezzlement or gambling, by converting it into a legitimate source. It is a crime in many jurisdictions with varying definitions. It is usually a key operation of organized crime.

In US law, money laundering is the practice of engaging in financial transactions to conceal the identity, source, or destination of illegally gained money. In UK law the common law definition is wider. The act is defined as "taking any action with property of any form which is either wholly or in part the proceeds of a crime that will disguise the fact that that property is the proceeds of a crime or obscure the beneficial ownership of said property".

In the past, the term "money laundering" was applied only to financial transactions related to organized crime. Today its definition is often expanded by government and international regulators such as the US Office of the Comptroller of the Currency to mean "any financial transaction which generates an asset or a value as the result of an illegal act", which may involve actions such as tax evasion or false accounting. In the UK, it does not even need to involve money, but any economic good. Courts involve money laundering committed by private individuals, drug dealers, businesses, corrupt officials, members of criminal organizations such as the Mafia, and even states.

As financial crime has become more complex, and financial intelligence has become more recognized in combating international crime and terrorism, money laundering has become more prominent in political, economic, and legal debate. Money laundering is ipso facto illegal; the acts generating the money almost always are themselves criminal in some way (for if not, the money would not need to be laundered).

History
Laws against money laundering were created to use against organized crime during the period of Prohibition in the United States during the 1930s. Organized crime received a major boost from Prohibition and a large source of new funds that were obtained from illegal sales of alcohol. The successful prosecution of Al Capone on tax evasion brought in a new emphasis by the state and law enforcement agencies to track and confiscate money, but existing laws against tax evasion could not be used once gangsters started paying their taxes.

In the 1980s, the war on drugs led governments again to turn to money laundering rules in an attempt to track and seize the proceeds of drug crimes in order to catch the organizers and individuals running drug empires. It also had the benefit, from a law enforcement point of view, of turning rules of evidence "upside down". Law enforcers normally have to prove an individual is guilty to seize their property, but with money laundering laws money can be confiscated and it is up to the individual to prove that the source of funds is legitimate to get the money back. This makes it much easier for law enforcement agencies and provides for much lower burdens of proof. However, this process has been abused by some law enforcement agencies to take and keep money without strong evidence of related criminal activity, to be used to supplement their own budgets.

The September 11 attacks in 2001, which led to the Patriot Act in the U.S. and similar legislation worldwide, led to a new emphasis on money laundering laws to combat terrorism financing. The Group of Seven (G7) nations used the Financial Action Task Force on Money Laundering to put pressure on governments around the world to increase surveillance and monitoring of financial transactions and share this information between countries. Starting in 2002, governments around the world upgraded money laundering laws and surveillance and monitoring systems of financial transactions. Anti-money laundering regulations have become a much larger burden for financial institutions and enforcement has stepped up significantly.

During 2011–2015 a number of major banks faced ever-increasing fines for breaches of money laundering regulations. This included HSBC, which was fined $1.9 billion in December 2012, and BNP Paribas, which was fined $8.9 billion in July 2014 by the U.S. government. Many countries introduced or strengthened border controls on the amount of cash that can be carried and introduced central transaction reporting systems where all financial institutions have to report all financial transactions electronically. For example, in 2006, Australia set up the AUSTRAC system and required the reporting of all financial transactions.

Features

Definition
 Money laundering is the conversion or transfer of property; the concealment or disguising of the nature of the proceeds; the acquisition, possession or use of property, knowing that these are derived from criminal acts; the participating in or assisting the movement of funds to make the proceeds appear legitimate.

Money obtained from certain crimes, such as extortion, insider trading, drug trafficking, and illegal gambling is "dirty" and needs to be "cleaned" to appear to have been derived from legal activities, so that banks and other financial institutions will deal with it without suspicion. Money can be laundered by many methods that vary in complexity and sophistication.

Money laundering typically involves three steps: The first involves introducing cash into the financial system by some means ("placement"); the second involves carrying out complex financial transactions to camouflage the illegal source of the cash ("layering"); and finally, acquiring wealth generated from the transactions of the illicit funds ("integration"). Some of these steps may be omitted, depending upon the circumstances. For example, non-cash proceeds that are already in the financial system would not need to be placed.

According to the United States Treasury Department:

Methods

List of methods
Money laundering can take several forms, although most methodologies can be categorized into one of a few types. These include "bank methods, smurfing [also known as structuring], currency exchanges, and double-invoicing".

 Structuring: Often known as smurfing, is a method of placement whereby cash is broken into smaller deposits of money, used to defeat suspicion of money laundering and to avoid anti-money laundering reporting requirements. A sub-component of this is to use smaller amounts of cash to purchase bearer instruments, such as money orders, and then ultimately deposit those, again in small amounts.
 Bulk cash smuggling: This involves physically smuggling cash to another jurisdiction and depositing it in a financial institution, such as an offshore bank, that offers greater bank secrecy or less rigorous money laundering enforcement.
 Cash-intensive businesses: In this method, a business typically expected to receive a large proportion of its revenue as cash uses its accounts to deposit criminally derived cash. This method of money laundering often causes organized crime and corporate crime to overlap. Such enterprises often operate openly and in doing so generate cash revenue from incidental legitimate business in addition to the illicit cash. In such cases the business will usually claim all cash received as legitimate earnings. Service businesses are best suited to this method, as such enterprises have little or no variable costs and/or a large ratio between revenue and variable costs, which makes it difficult to detect discrepancies between revenues and costs. Examples are parking structures, strip clubs, tanning salons, car washes, arcades, bars, restaurants, casinos, barber shops, DVD stores, movie theaters, and beach resorts.
 Trade-based laundering: This method is one of the newest and most complex forms of money laundering. This involves under- or over-valuing invoices to disguise the movement of money. For example, the art market has been accused of being an ideal vehicle for money laundering due to several unique aspects of art such as the subjective value of art works as well as the secrecy of auction houses about the identity of the buyer and seller.
 Shell companies and trusts: Trusts and shell companies disguise the true owners of money. Trusts and corporate vehicles, depending on the jurisdiction, need not disclose their true owner.  Sometimes referred to by the slang term rathole, though that term usually refers to a person acting as the fictitious owner rather than the business entity.
 Round-tripping: Here, money is deposited in a controlled foreign corporation offshore, preferably in a tax haven where minimal records are kept, and then shipped back as a foreign direct investment, exempt from taxation. A variant on this is to transfer money to a law firm or similar organization as funds on account of fees, then to cancel the retainer and, when the money is remitted, represent the sums received from the lawyers as a legacy under a will or proceeds of litigation.
 Bank capture: In this case, money launderers or criminals buy a controlling interest in a bank, preferably in a jurisdiction with weak money laundering controls, and then move money through the bank without scrutiny.
Invoice Fraud: An example is when a criminal contacts a company saying that the supplier payment details have changed. They then provide alternative, fraudulent details in order for you to pay them money.
 Casinos: In this method, an individual walks into a casino and buys chips with illicit cash. The individual will then play for a relatively short time. When the person cashes in the chips, they will expect to take payment in a check, or at least get a receipt so they can claim the proceeds as gambling winnings.
 Other gambling: Money is spent on gambling, preferably on high odds games. One way to minimize risk with this method is to bet on every possible outcome of some event that has many possible outcomes, so no outcome(s) have short odds, and the bettor will lose only the vigorish and will have one or more winning bets that can be shown as the source of money. The losing bets will remain hidden.
 Black salaries: A company may have unregistered employees without written contracts and pay them cash salaries. Dirty money might be used to pay them.
 Tax amnesties: For example, those that legalize unreported assets and cash in tax havens.
Transaction Laundering: When a merchant unknowingly processes illicit credit card transactions for another business. It is a growing problem and recognised as distinct from traditional money laundering in using the payments ecosystem to hide that the transaction even occurred (e.g. the use of fake front websites). Also known as "undisclosed aggregation" or "factoring".
 Online job marketplaces such as Freelancer.com and Fiverr, which accept funds from clients and hold them in escrow to pay freelancers.  A money launderer can post a token job on one of these sites, and send the money for the site to hold in escrow. The launderer (or his associate) can then sign on as a freelancer (using a different account and IP address), accept and complete the job, and be paid the funds.

Digital electronic money

In theory, electronic money should provide as easy a method of transferring value without revealing identity as untracked banknotes, especially wire transfers involving anonymity-protecting numbered bank accounts.  In practice, however, the record-keeping capabilities of Internet service providers and other network resource maintainers tend to frustrate that intention.  While some cryptocurrencies under recent development have aimed to provide for more possibilities of transaction anonymity for various reasons, the degree to which they succeed — and, in consequence, the degree to which they offer benefits for money laundering efforts — is controversial. Solutions such as ZCash and Monero ― known as privacy coins ― are examples of cryptocurrencies that provide unlinkable anonymity via proofs and/or obfuscation of information (ring signatures). While not suitable for large-scaled crimes, privacy coins like Monero are suitable for laundering money made through small-scaled crimes.

Apart from traditional cryptocurrencies, Non-Fungible Tokens (NFTs) are also commonly used in connection with money laundering activities. NFTs are often used to perform Wash Trading by creating several different wallets for one individual, generating several fictitious sales and consequently selling the respective NFT to a third party. According to a report by Chainalysis these types of wash trades are becoming increasingly popular among money launderers especially due to the largely anonymous nature of transactions on NFT marketplaces. Auction platforms for NFT sales may face regulatory pressure to comply with anti-money laundering legislation.

In 2013, Jean-Loup Richet, a research fellow at ESSEC ISIS, surveyed new techniques that cybercriminals were using in a report written for the United Nations Office on Drugs and Crime. A common approach was to use a digital currency exchanger service which converted dollars into a digital currency called Liberty Reserve, and could be sent and received anonymously. The receiver could convert the Liberty Reserve currency back into cash for a small fee. In May 2013, the US authorities shut down Liberty Reserve charging its founder and various others with money laundering.

Another increasingly common way of laundering money is to use online gaming. In a growing number of online games, such as Second Life and World of Warcraft, it is possible to convert money into virtual goods, services, or virtual cash that can later be converted back into money.

To avoid the usage of decentralized digital money such as Bitcoin for the profit of crime and corruption, Australia is planning to strengthen the nation's anti-money laundering laws.
The characteristics of Bitcoin—it is completely deterministic, protocol based and can be difficult to censor—make it possible to circumvent national laws using services like Tor to obfuscate transaction origins. Bitcoin relies completely on cryptography, not on a central entity running under a KYC framework. There are several cases in which criminals have cashed out a significant amount of Bitcoin after ransomware attacks, drug dealings, cyber fraud and gunrunning. However, many digital currency exchanges are now operating KYC programs under threat of regulation from the jurisdictions they operate in.

Reverse money laundering

Reverse money laundering is a process that disguises a legitimate source of funds that are to be used for illegal purposes. It is usually perpetrated for the purpose of financing terrorism but can be also used by criminal organizations that have invested in legal businesses and would like to withdraw legitimate funds from official circulation. Unaccounted cash received via disguising financial transactions is not included in official financial reporting and could be used to evade taxes, hand in bribes and pay "under-the-table" salaries. For example, in an affidavit filed on 24 March 2014 in United States District Court, Northern California, San Francisco Division, FBI special agent Emmanuel V. Pascau alleged that several people associated with the Chee Kung Tong organization, and California State Senator Leland Yee, engaged in reverse money laundering activities.

The problem of such fraudulent encashment practices (obnalichka in Russian) has become acute in Russia and other countries of the former Soviet Union. The Eurasian Group on Combating Money Laundering and Financing of Terrorism (EAG) reported that the Russian Federation, Ukraine, Turkey, Serbia, Kyrgyzstan, Uzbekistan, Armenia and Kazakhstan have encountered a substantial shrinkage of tax base and shifting money supply balance in favor of cash. These processes have complicated planning and management of the economy and contributed to the growth of the shadow economy.

Magnitude
Many regulatory and governmental authorities issue estimates each year for the amount of money laundered, either worldwide or within their national economy. In 1996, a spokesperson for the IMF estimated that 2–5% of the worldwide global economy involved laundered money. The Financial Action Task Force on Money Laundering (FATF), an intergovernmental body set up to combat money laundering, stated, "Due to the illegal nature of the transactions, precise statistics are not available and it is therefore impossible to produce a definitive estimate of the amount of money that is globally laundered every year. The FATF therefore does not publish any figures in this regard." Academic commentators have likewise been unable to estimate the volume of money with any degree of assurance. Various estimates of the scale of global money laundering are sometimes repeated often enough to make some people regard them as factual—but no researcher has overcome the inherent difficulty of measuring an actively concealed practice.

Regardless of the difficulty in measurement, the amount of money laundered each year is in the billions of US dollars and poses a significant policy concern for governments. As a result, governments and international bodies have undertaken efforts to deter, prevent, and apprehend money launderers. Financial institutions have likewise undertaken efforts to prevent and detect transactions involving dirty money, both as a result of government requirements and to avoid the reputational risk involved. Issues relating to money laundering have existed as long as there have been large scale criminal enterprises. Modern anti-money laundering laws have developed along with the modern War on Drugs. In more recent times anti-money laundering legislation is seen as adjunct to the financial crime of terrorist financing in that both crimes usually involve the transmission of funds through the financial system (although money laundering relates to where the money has come from, and terrorist financing relating to where the money is going to).

Transaction laundering is a massive and growing problem. Finextra estimated that transaction laundering accounted for over $200 billion in the US in 2017 alone, with over $6 billion of these sales involving illicit goods or services, sold by nearly 335,000 unregistered merchants.

Combating

Anti-money laundering (AML) is a term mainly used in the financial and legal industries to describe the legal controls that require financial institutions and other regulated entities to prevent, detect, and report money laundering activities. Anti-money laundering guidelines came into prominence globally as a result of the formation of the Financial Action Task Force (FATF) and the promulgation of an international framework of anti-money laundering standards. These standards began to have more relevance in 2000 and 2001, after FATF began a process to publicly identify countries that were deficient in their anti-money laundering laws and international cooperation, a process colloquially known as "name and shame".

An effective AML program requires a jurisdiction to criminalise money laundering, giving the relevant regulators and police the powers and tools to investigate; be able to share information with other countries as appropriate; and require financial institutions to identify their customers, establish risk-based controls, keep records, and report suspicious activities.

Strict background checks are necessary to combat as many money launderers escape by investing through complex ownership and company structures. Banks can do that but proper surveillance is required on the government side to reduce this.

Over recent years, the rise in anti-money laundering mechanisms has been attributed to the use of big data and artificial intelligence. Traditional anti-money laundering systems are falling behind against evolving threats and new technologies are helping AML compliance officers to deal with: poor implementation, expanding regulation, administrative complexity, false positives.

Criminalization

The elements of the crime of money laundering are set forth in the United Nations Convention Against Illicit Traffic in Narcotic Drugs and Psychotropic Substances and Convention against Transnational Organized Crime. It is defined as knowingly engaging in a financial transaction with the proceeds of a crime for the purpose of concealing or disguising the illicit origin of the property from governments.

Role of financial institutions
While banks operating in the same country generally have to follow the same anti-money laundering laws and regulations, financial institutions all structure their anti-money laundering efforts slightly differently. Today, most financial institutions globally, and many non-financial institutions, are required to identify and report transactions of a suspicious nature to the financial intelligence unit in the respective country. For example, a bank must verify a customer's identity and, if necessary, monitor transactions for suspicious activity. This process comes under "know your customer" measures, which means knowing the identity of the customer and understanding the kinds of transactions in which the customer is likely to engage. By knowing one's customers, financial institutions can often identify unusual or suspicious behaviour, termed anomalies, which may be an indication of money laundering.

Bank employees, such as tellers and customer account representatives, are trained in anti-money laundering and are instructed to report activities that they deem suspicious. Additionally, anti-money laundering software filters customer data, classifies it according to level of suspicion, and inspects it for anomalies. Such anomalies include any sudden and substantial increase in funds, a large withdrawal, or moving money to a bank secrecy jurisdiction. Smaller transactions that meet certain criteria may also be flagged as suspicious. For example, structuring can lead to flagged transactions. The software also flags names on government "blacklists" and transactions that involve countries hostile to the host nation. Once the software has mined data and flagged suspect transactions, it alerts bank management, who must then determine whether to file a report with the government.

Enforcement costs and associated privacy concerns
The financial services industry has become more vocal about the rising costs of anti-money laundering regulation and the limited benefits that they claim it brings. One commentator wrote that "[w]ithout facts, [anti-money laundering] legislation has been driven on rhetoric, driving by ill-guided activism responding to the need to be "seen to be doing something" rather than by an objective understanding of its effects on predicate crime. The social panic approach is justified by the language used—we talk of the battle against terrorism or the war on drugs". The Economist magazine has become increasingly vocal in its criticism of such regulation, particularly with reference to countering terrorist financing, referring to it as a "costly failure", although it concedes that other efforts (like reducing identity and credit card fraud) may still be effective at combating money laundering.

There is no precise measurement of the costs of regulation balanced against the harms associated with money laundering, and given the evaluation problems involved in assessing such an issue, it is unlikely that the effectiveness of terror finance and money laundering laws could be determined with any degree of accuracy. The Economist estimated the annual costs of anti-money laundering efforts in Europe and North America at US$5 billion in 2003, an increase from US$700 million in 2000. Government-linked economists have noted the significant negative effects of money laundering on economic development, including undermining domestic capital formation, depressing growth, and diverting capital away from development. Because of the intrinsic uncertainties of the amount of money laundered, changes in the amount of money laundered, and the cost of anti-money laundering systems, it is almost impossible to tell which anti-money laundering systems work and which are more or less cost effective.

Besides economic costs to implement anti-money-laundering laws, improper attention to data protection practices may entail disproportionate costs to individual privacy rights. In June 2011, the data-protection advisory committee to the European Union issued a report on data protection issues related to the prevention of money laundering and terrorist financing, which identified numerous transgressions against the established legal framework on privacy and data protection. The report made recommendations on how to address money laundering and terrorist financing in ways that safeguard personal privacy rights and data protection laws. In the United States, groups such as the American Civil Liberties Union have expressed concern that money laundering rules require banks to report on their own customers, essentially conscripting private businesses "into agents of the surveillance state".

Many countries are obligated by various international instruments and standards, such as the 1988 United Nations Convention Against Illicit Traffic in Narcotic Drugs and Psychotropic Substances, the 2000 Convention against Transnational Organized Crime, the 2003 United Nations Convention against Corruption, and the recommendations of the 1989 Financial Action Task Force on Money Laundering (FATF) to enact and enforce money laundering laws in an effort to stop narcotics trafficking, international organized crime, and corruption. Mexico, which has faced a significant increase in violent crime, established anti-money laundering controls in 2013 to curb the underlying crime issue.

Global organizations
Formed in 1989 by the G7 countries, the Financial Action Task Force on Money Laundering (FATF) is an intergovernmental body whose purpose is to develop and promote an international response to combat money laundering. The FATF Secretariat is housed at the headquarters of the OECD in Paris. In October 2001, FATF expanded its mission to include combating the financing of terrorism. FATF is a policy-making body that brings together legal, financial, and law enforcement experts to achieve national legislation and regulatory AML and CFT reforms.  its membership consists of 36 countries and territories and two regional organizations.  FATF works in collaboration with a number of international bodies and organizations. These entities have observer status with FATF, which does not entitle them to vote, but permits them full participation in plenary sessions and working groups.

FATF has developed 40 recommendations on money laundering and 9 special recommendations regarding terrorist financing. FATF assesses each member country against these recommendations in published reports. Countries seen as not being sufficiently compliant with such recommendations are subjected to financial sanctions.

FATF's three primary functions with regard to money laundering are:
 Monitoring members’ progress in implementing anti-money laundering measures,
 Reviewing and reporting on laundering trends, techniques, and countermeasures, and
 Promoting the adoption and implementation of FATF anti-money laundering standards globally.

The FATF currently comprises 34 member jurisdictions and 2 regional organisations, representing most major financial centres in all parts of the globe.

The United Nations Office on Drugs and Crime maintains the International Money Laundering Information Network, a website that provides information and software for anti-money laundering data collection and analysis. The World Bank has a website that provides policy advice and best practices to governments and the private sector on anti-money laundering issues. The Basel AML Index is an independent annual ranking that assesses the risk of money laundering and terrorist financing around the world.

Anti-money laundering measures by region
Many jurisdictions adopt a list of specific predicate crimes for money laundering prosecutions, while others criminalize the proceeds of any serious crimes.

Afghanistan

The Financial Transactions and Reports Analysis Center of Afghanistan (FinTRACA) was established as a Financial Intelligence Unit (FIU) under the Anti Money Laundering and Proceeds of Crime Law passed by decree late in 2004. The main purpose of this law is to protect the integrity of the Afghan financial system and to gain compliance with international treaties and conventions. The Financial Intelligence Unit is a semi-independent body that is administratively housed within the Central Bank of Afghanistan (Da Afghanistan Bank). The main objective of FinTRACA is to deny the use of the Afghan financial system to those who obtained funds as the result of illegal activity, and to those who would use it to support terrorist activities.

To meet its objectives, the FinTRACA collects and analyzes information from a variety of sources. These sources include entities with legal obligations to submit reports to the FinTRACA when a suspicious activity is detected, as well as reports of cash transactions above a threshold amount specified by regulation. Also, FinTRACA has access to all related Afghan government information and databases. When the analysis of this information supports the supposition of illegal use of the financial system, the FinTRACA works closely with law enforcement to investigate and prosecute the illegal activity. FinTRACA also cooperates internationally in support of its own analyses and investigations and to support the analyses and investigations of foreign counterparts, to the extent allowed by law. Other functions include training of those entities with legal obligations to report information, development of laws and regulations to support national-level AML objectives, and international and regional cooperation in the development of AML typologies and countermeasures.

Armenia 
To ensure the existence of legal mechanisms necessary for the stability of Armenian economy, the government set up a Financial Monitoring Center (FMC). The Financial Monitoring Center of Armenia is a financial intelligence unit of an administrative type and is situated in the Central Bank of Armenia. The center proposed and adopted the Law of the Republic of Armenia on fight against Legalizing the Illegal Incomes and Financing of Terrorism. This Law is based on the FATF 40 Recommendations, model laws and best international practices. The law is intended to protect the rights, freedoms and legal interests of the citizens, society, and the state, as well as to ensure the existence of legal mechanisms necessary for the stability of economic system of the Republic of Armenia. The objectives of the Financial Monitoring Center are: 

 Implement specific measures to detect and deter money laundering and the financing of terrorist activities and to facilitate the investigation and prosecution of money laundering and terrorist financing offences including: Mandatory report requirement of suspicious financial transaction, large electronic fund transfers, and all large cash transactions, establishment of record keeping and client identification requirements for financial service providers and other persons that engage in businesses, professions or activities that are susceptible to being used for money laundering and the financing of terrorist activities.
 Fulfill Armenia’s commitments to participate in the global fight against money laundering and terrorist financing. Towards this end, a special agency called Interagency Task Force 4 was created, which is responsible for the continual effective and cooperative activity in the sphere of fraudulence connected with money laundering, credit cards as well as terrorist financing in Armenia.
 To respond to the threat posed by organized criminals and terrorists by providing law enforcement officials with the information they need to deprive criminals and terrorists of the proceeds of their criminal activities and funds to support terrorist activities, while ensuring that appropriate safeguards are put in place to protect privacy of persons with respect to personal information.

Australia

Australia has adopted a number of strategies to combat money laundering, which mirror those of a majority of western countries. The Australian Transaction Reports and Analysis Centre (AUSTRAC) is Australia's financial intelligence unit to combat money laundering and terrorism financing, which requires every provider of designated services in Australia to report to it suspicious cash or other transactions and other specific information. The Attorney-General's Department maintains a list of outlawed terror organisations. It is an offense to materially support or be supported by such organisations. It is an offence to open a bank account in Australia in a false name, and rigorous procedures must be followed when new bank accounts are opened.

The Anti-Money Laundering and Counter-Terrorism Financing Act 2006 (Cth) (AML/CTF Act) is the principal legislative instrument, although there are also offence provisions contained in Division 400 of the Criminal Code Act 1995 (Cth). Upon its introduction, it was intended that the AML/CTF Act would be further amended by a second tranche of reforms extending to designated non-financial businesses and professions (DNFBPs) including, inter alia, lawyers, accountants, jewellers and real estate agents; however, those further reforms have yet to be progressed.

The Proceeds of Crime Act 2002 (Cth) imposes criminal penalties on a person who engages in money laundering.

Balkans

The organized criminal groups in Albania had long been involved in several illicit activities, including drug trade, arms and human trafficking, kidnapping, murders and others. Such criminals were attracted to the United Arab Emirates to seek refuge and to launder their illegal wealth. The UAE lacked regulations to combat the issue of terror funding and money laundering. Consequently, it became a safe haven for criminals from Albania and other Balkan countries, who escaped justice and continued to carry out their illegal activities while living in the Emirates. For countries like Albania, the complications were greater, due to the lack of bilateral extradition treaty with the UAE. Authorities in Albania struggled and failed to get most of the criminals extradited from the Emirates. Usually, the Gulf nation doesn’t refuse to extradite these criminals, but it used to extend the process to the point of their release.

Bangladesh
The first anti-money laundering legislation in Bangladesh was the Money Laundering Prevention Act, 2002. It was replaced by the Money Laundering Prevention Ordinance 2008. Subsequently, the ordinance was repealed by the Money Laundering Prevention Act, 2009. In 2012, government again replaced it with the Money Laundering Prevention Act, 2012

In terms of section 2, "Money Laundering means – (i)  knowingly moving, converting, or transferring proceeds of crime or property involved in an offence for the following purposes:- (1) concealing or disguising the illicit nature, source, location, ownership or control of the proceeds of crime; or (2) assisting any person involved in the commission of the predicate offence to evade the legal consequences of such offence;  (ii) smuggling money or property earned through legal or illegal means to a foreign country; (iii)  knowingly transferring or remitting the proceeds of crime to a foreign country or remitting or bringing them into Bangladesh from a foreign country with the intention of hiding or disguising its illegal source; or (iv) concluding or attempting to conclude financial transactions in such a manner so as to reporting requirement under this Act may be avoided;(v) converting or moving or transferring property with the intention to instigate or assist for committing a predicate offence; (vi) acquiring, possessing or using any property, knowing that such property is the proceeds of a predicate offence; (vii) performing such activities so as to the illegal source of the proceeds of crime may be concealed or disguised; (viii) participating in, associating with, conspiring, attempting, abetting, instigate or counsel to commit any offences mentioned above."

To prevent these Illegal uses of money, the Bangladesh government has introduced the Money Laundering Prevention Act. The Act was last amended in the year 2009 and all the financial institutes are following this act. Till today there are 26 circulars issued by Bangladesh Bank under this act. To prevent money laundering, a banker must do the following:
 While opening a new account, the account opening form should be duly filled up by all the information of the customer.
 The KYC must be properly filled.
 The Transaction Profile (TP) is mandatory for a client to understand his/her transactions. If needed, the TP must be updated at the client's consent.
 All other necessary papers should be properly collected along with the National ID card.
 If any suspicious transaction is noticed, the Branch Anti Money Laundering Compliance Officer (BAMLCO) must be notified and accordingly the Suspicious Transaction Report (STR) must be filled out.
 The cash department should be aware of the transactions. It must be noted if suddenly a big amount of money is deposited in any account. Proper documents are required if any client does this type of transaction.
 Structuring, over/ under invoicing is another way to do money laundering. The foreign exchange department should look into this matter cautiously.
 If any account has a transaction over 1 million taka in a single day, it must be reported in a cash transaction report (CTR).
 All bank officials must go through all the 26 circulars and use them.

Canada

In 1991, the Proceeds of Crime (Money Laundering) Act was brought into force in Canada to give legal effect to the former FATF Forty Recommendations by establishing record keeping and client identification requirements in the financial sector to facilitate the investigation and prosecution of money laundering offences under the Criminal Code and the Controlled Drugs and Substances Act.

In 2000, the Proceeds of Crime (Money Laundering) Act was amended to expand the scope of its application and to establish a financial intelligence unit with national control over money laundering, namely FINTRAC.

In December 2001, the scope of the Proceeds of Crime (Money Laundering) Act was again expanded by amendments enacted under the Anti-Terrorism Act with the objective of deterring terrorist activity by cutting off sources and channels of funding used by terrorists in response to 9/11.  The Proceeds of Crime (Money Laundering) Act was renamed the Proceeds of Crime (Money Laundering) and Terrorist Financing Act.

In December 2006, the Proceeds of Crime (Money Laundering) and Terrorist Financing Act was further amended, in part, in response to pressure from the FATF for Canada to tighten its money laundering and financing of terrorism legislation.  The amendments expanded the client identification, record-keeping and reporting requirements for certain organizations and included new obligations to report attempted suspicious transactions and outgoing and incoming international electronic fund transfers, undertake risk assessments and implement written compliance procedures in respect of those risks.

The amendments also enabled greater money laundering and terrorist financing intelligence-sharing among enforcement agencies.

In Canada, casinos, money service businesses, notaries, accountants, banks, securities brokers, life insurance agencies, real estate salespeople and dealers in precious metals and stones are subject to the reporting and record keeping obligations under the Proceeds of Crime (Money Laundering) and Terrorist Financing Act. However, in recent years, casinos and realtors have been embroiled in scandal for aiding and abetting money launderers, especially in Vancouver, which has come to be known as the "Vancouver Model". Some have speculated that approximately $1 Billion is laundered in Vancouver per year.

European Union
The fourth iteration of the EU's anti-money laundering directive (AMLD IV) was published on 5 June 2015, after clearing its last legislative stop at the European Parliament. This directive brought the EU's money laundering laws more in line with the US's, which is advantageous for financial institutions operating in both jurisdictions. The Fifth Money Laundering Directive (5MLD) came into force on 10 January 2020, addressing a number of weaknesses in the European Union's AML/CFT regime that came to light after the enactment of the Fourth Money Laundering Directive AMLD IV). The AMLD5 increased the scope of the EU's AML regulations. It decreased the threshold of customer identity verification for the prepaid card industry from EUR 250 to EUR 150. The customers who deposit or transfer funds more than EUR150 will be identified by the prepaid card issuing company.
Lack of harmonization in AML requirements between the US and EU has complicated the compliance efforts of global institutions that are looking to standardize the Know Your Customer (KYC) component of their AML programs across key jurisdictions. AMLD IV promises to better align the AML regimes by adopting a more risk-based approach compared to its predecessor, AMLD III.

Certain components of the directive, however, go beyond current requirements in both the EU and US, imposing new implementation challenges on banks. For instance, more public officials are brought within the scope of the directive, and EU member states are required to establish new registries of "beneficial owners" (i.e., those who ultimately own or control each company) which will impact banks. AMLD IV became effective 25 June 2015.

On 24 January 2019, the European Commission sent official warnings to ten member states as part of a crackdown on lax application of money laundering regulations. The Commission sent Germany a letter of formal notice, the first step of the EU legal procedure against states. Belgium, Finland, France, Lithuania, and Portugal were sent reasoned opinions, the second step of the procedure which could lead to fines. A second round of reasoned opinions was sent to Bulgaria, Cyprus, Poland, and Slovakia. The ten countries have two months to respond or face court action. The commission had set a 26 June 2017 deadline for EU countries to apply new rules against money laundering and terrorist financing.

On 13 February 2019, the Commission added Saudi Arabia, Panama, Nigeria and other jurisdictions to a blacklist of nations that pose a threat because of lax controls on terrorism financing and money laundering. This is a more expansive list than that of FATF.

In addition, the European Commission has created a list of high-risk countries on money laundering and terrorism financing, including: Afghanistan, Iran, Iraq, North Korea, Syria, Uganda, Vanuatu and Yemen (since 20 September 2016), Trinidad and Tobago (since 14 February 2018), Pakistan (since 2 October 2018), The Bahamas, Barbados, Botswana, Cambodia, Ghana, Jamaica, Mauritius, Mongolia, Myanmar, Nicaragua, Panama and Zimbabwe (since 1 October 2020).

India

In 2002, the Parliament of India passed an act called the Prevention of Money Laundering Act, 2002. The main objectives of this act are to prevent money-laundering as well as to provide for confiscation of property either derived from or involved in, money-laundering.

Section 12 (1) describes the obligations that banks, other financial institutions, and intermediaries have to 
(a) Maintain records that detail the nature and value of transactions, whether such transactions comprise a single transaction or a series of connected transactions, and where these transactions take place within a month.
(b) Furnish information on transactions referred to in clause (a) to the Director within the time prescribed, including records of the identity of all its clients.

Section 12 (2) prescribes that the records referred to in sub-section (1) as mentioned above, must be maintained for ten years after the transactions finished. It is handled by the Indian Income Tax Department.

The provisions of the Act are frequently reviewed and various amendments have been passed from time to time.

Most money laundering activities in India are through political parties, corporate companies and the share market. These are investigated by the Enforcement Directorate and Indian Income Tax Department. According to Government of India, out of the total tax arrears of  about  pertain to money laundering and securities scam cases.

Bank accountants must record all transactions over Rs. 1 million and maintain such records for 10 years. Banks must also make cash transaction reports (CTRs) and suspicious transaction reports over Rs. 1 million within 7 days of initial suspicion. They must submit their reports to the Enforcement Directorate and Income Tax Department.

Nigeria 
To combat money laundering, the Economic and Financial Crimes Commission was established in 2003. This body works alongside the Central Bank of Nigeria and the National Drug Law Enforcement Agency, to investigate and prosecute, individuals charged with the crime. The Money laundering Act was also established in 2011. This act contains elaborate provisions on the legal and institutional framework to prevent money laundering. The act also established the Special Control Unit against Money Laundering, under the EFCC. This act made key changes to the repealed act, some of which are;

 Restrictions on cash payment transactions: Transactions exceeding N5 million for individuals and N10 million for corporate bodies are to be made through a banking system, and any attempt at breaking up these transactions must be reported.
 Enhanced KYC requirements for agents and politically exposed persons;

The act also states that all agents acting on behalf of customers must be fully identified and verified. It also established that the source of wealth of political persons must be investigated and identified.

 Preservation and reconstruction of transaction records: The MLA states that all transaction records must be stored for a minimum of five years, and should be preserved in a way that they can be readily accessible when in need.
 Pre-launch assessment of new technologies or products: From henceforth all new technologies must be assessed for money laundering and terrorism risks, and appropriate measures must be taken to manage and mitigate the risks.
 Establishment of the Special Control Unit against Money Laundering: The act established and statutorily backed this body to monitor and oversee the operations of non-financial institutions. And this body works under the EFCC.
 Financial transaction and reporting: All transactions exceeding N5 million for individuals and N10 million for corporate bodies, must be reported by all financial institutions to the Nigerian Financial Intelligence Unit.

Other measures have been taken by the government to prevent money laundering. In May 2022, President Muhammadu Buhari signed into law three bills. These bills are; Money laundering (Prevention and Prohibition bill), 2022, the Terrorism (Prevention and Prohibition bill) 2022, and the Proceeds of Crime (Recovery and Management) Bill, 2022. The Central Bank of Nigeria also listed Regulations to prevent Money laundering in Nigeria. The Apex bank stated that all transactions conducted through correspondent banking relationships shall be managed with a risk-based approach and Know Your Correspondent procedures, this is to ascertain whether the bank or financial institution is regulated by a money laundering prevention body. The correspondent is to take action to identify the customer. The CBN also released a guidance note named; Anti-money Laundering/combating the financing of terrorism (AML/CFT) for OFIs. The CBN Financial Policy and Regulation Director Chibuzo Efobi mentioned that the guidance note would enable the sub-sector to identify, assess and minimize the risks of terrorist financing and money laundering. He also said that this Guidance note would identify risk management procedures that would lessen the vulnerability of financial institutions to Money laundering schemes.

Latin America 

In Latin America, money laundering is mainly linked to drug trafficking activities and to having connections with criminal activity, such as crimes that have to do with arms trafficking, human trafficking, extortion, blackmail, smuggling, and acts of corruption of people linked to governments, such as bribery, which are more common in Latin American countries. There is a relationship between corruption and money laundering in developing countries. The economic power of Latin America increases rapidly and without support, these fortunes being of illicit origin having the appearance of legally acquired profits. With regard to money laundering, the ultimate goal of the process is to integrate illicit capital into the general economy and transform it into licit goods and services.

The money laundering practice uses various channels to legalize everything achieved through illegal practices. As such, it has different techniques depending on the country where this illegal operation is going to be carried out:

 In Colombia, the laundering of billions of dollars, which come from drug trafficking, is carried out through imports of contraband from the parallel exchange market.
 In Central American countries such as Guatemala and Honduras, money laundering continues to increase in the absence of adequate legislation and regulations in these countries. Money laundering activities in Costa Rica have experienced substantial growth, especially using large-scale currency smuggling and investments of drug cartels in real estate, within the tourism sector. Furthermore, the Colon Free Zone in Panama, continues to be the area of operations for money laundering where cash is exchanged for products of different nature that are then put up for sale at prices below those of production for a return fast of the capital.
 In Mexico, the preferred techniques continue to be the smuggling of currency abroad, in addition to electronic transfers, bank drafts with Mexican banks and operations in the parallel exchange market.
 Money Laundering in the Caribbean countries continues to be a serious problem that seems to be very dangerous. Specifically, in Antigua, the Dominican Republic, Jamaica, Saint Vincent and the Grenadines. Citizens of the Dominican Republic who have been involved in money laundering in the United States, use companies that are dedicated to transferring funds sent to the Dominican Republic in amounts of less than $10,000 under the use of false names. Moreover, in Jamaica, multimillion-dollar asset laundering cases were discovered through telephone betting operations abroad. Thousands of suspicious transactions have been detected in French overseas territories. Free trade zones such as Aruba, meanwhile, remain the preferred areas for money laundering. The offshore banking centers, the secret bank accounts and the tourist complexes are the channels through which the launderers whiten the proceeds of the illicit money.

Casinos continue to attract organizations that deal with money laundering. Aruba and the Netherlands Antilles, the Cayman Islands, Colombia, Mexico, Panama and Venezuela are considered high priority countries in the region, due to the strategies used by the washers.

Economic impact in the region 
The practice of money laundering, among other economic and financial crimes seeps into the economic and political structures of most developing countries therefore resulting to political instability and economic digression.

Money laundering is still a great concern for the financial services industry.  About 50% of the money laundering incidents in Latin America were reported by organizations in the financial sector. According to PwC's 2014 global economic crime survey, in Latin America only 2.8% of respondents in Latin America claimed suffering Antitrust/Competition Law incidents, compared to 5.2% of respondents globally.

It has been shown that money laundering has an impact on the financial behavior and macroeconomic performance of the industrialized countries. In these countries the macroeconomic consequences of money laundering are transmitted through several channels. Thus, money laundering complicates the formulation of economic policies. It is assumed that the proceeds of criminal activities are laundered by means of the notes and coins in circulation of the monetary substitutes.

The laundering causes disproportionate changes in the relative prices of assets which implies that resources are allocated inefficiently; and, therefore may have negative implications for economic growth, apparently money laundering is associated with a lower economic growth.

The Office of National Drug Control Policy of the United States estimates that only in that country, sales of narcotic drugs represent about 57,000 million dollars annually and most of these transactions are made in cash.

Jurisprudence 
Money laundering has been increasing. A key factor behind the growing money laundering is the ineffective local enforcement of money laundering laws. Perhaps because of the lack of importance that has been given to the subject, since the 21st century started, there was no jurisprudence regarding the laundering of money, assets, the conversion or transfer of goods. What is even worse, the laws of the Latin American countries have not dealt with their study profoundly. It is an issue that concerns the whole world and is the subject of seminars, conferences, and academic analysis in different regions of the planet. Now a new figure called the Economic Criminal Law is being implemented, which should be implemented in modern societies, which has been inflicted enormous damage to the point of affecting the general economy of the states. Even though developing countries have responded and continue to respond, through legislative measures, to the problem of money laundering, at the national level, however, money launderers have taken advantage of the lax regulatory environment, vulnerable financial systems along with the continued civil and political unrest of most developing countries.

Singapore 
Singapore’s legal framework for combating money laundering is contained in a patchwork of legal instruments, the main elements of which are:
 The Corruption, Drug Trafficking and Other Serious Crimes (Confiscation of Benefits) Act (CDSA). This statute criminalises money laundering and imposes the requirement for persons to file suspicious transaction reports (STRs) and make a disclosure whenever physical currency or goods exceeding S$20,000 are carried into or out of Singapore.
 The Mutual Assistance in Criminal Matters Act (MACMA). This statute sets out the framework for mutual legal assistance in criminal matters.
 Legal instruments issued by regulatory agencies (such as the Monetary Authority of Singapore (MAS), in relation to financial institutions (FIs)) imposing requirements to conduct customer due diligence (CDD).
The term ‘money laundering’ is not used as such within the CDSA. Part VI of the CDSA criminalises the laundering of proceeds generated by criminal conduct and drug tracking via the following offences:
 The assistance of another person in retaining, controlling or using the benefits of drug dealing or criminal conduct under an arrangement (whether by concealment, removal from jurisdiction, transfer to nominees or otherwise) [section 43(1)/44(1)].
 The concealment, conversion, transfer or removal from the jurisdiction, or the acquisition, possession or use of benefits of drug dealing or criminal conduct [section 46(1)/47(1)].
 The concealment, conversion, transfer or removal from the jurisdiction of another person's benefits of drug dealing or criminal conduct [section 46(2)/47(2)].
 The acquirement, possession or use of another person's benefits of drug dealing or criminal conduct [section 46(3)/47(3)].

South Africa
In South Africa, the Financial Intelligence Centre Act (2001) and subsequent amendments have added responsibilities to the Financial Intelligence Centre (FIC) to combat money laundering.

Thailand

United Arab Emirates
The United Arab Emirates has long been known as a hub of illicit financial flows and corruption. A large number business, real estate and financial transactions of the country majorly involve some sort of illegal activity. Moreover, several corrupt and criminal actors from across the world operate through or from the Emirates, including European money launderers, Nigerian kleptocrats, East African gold smugglers, Afghan warlords and others. Even the royal family members of the UAE are often known to be associated with certain cases of offshore holdings. However, in 2022, the UAE fell into a risk of being named in the Financial Action Task Force (FATF) “grey list”. The list defines nations determined to have “strategic deficiencies” in combating money laundering and terrorist financing. On 4 March 2022, FATF placed the UAE in its ‘grey’ list of countries that are subject to increased monitoring. In April 2020, the Emirates had been warned of its money laundering activities, where FATF called the UAE’s limited prosecutions on the issue a “concern”. In November 2021, the group received a report from the Emirates, which didn't reach much of the thresholds required for avoid the grey list.

The Irish Department of Housing urged minister Darragh O’Brien to “ask in the strongest terms for the UAE to account for its relationship to Daniel Kinahan” a drug kingpin charged along with his brother, Christopher Kinahan in 2018 by the High Court of controlling and managing the daily drug operations in Ireland. The Kinahan brothers are sons of the Kinahan Cartel founder, Christy Kinahan Senior, who smuggled drugs and firearms into the UK, Ireland, and mainland Europe for long. For several years, the Kinahan leadership had been residing in Dubai, where Daniel denied his involvement in organized crime by defending himself as a ‘high-profile businessman in the professional boxing industry’. According to Panorama investigation, Daniel has operated in the boxing industry through MTK and simultaneously operated Europe’s biggest money laundering, drug trafficking, and gangland executions networks from Dubai. A spokesperson for minister O’Brien said, “respect for human rights is a cornerstone of Ireland’s foreign policy,” when asked if the minister would raise the concerns regarding Daniel’s presence and operations in Dubai on his visit in March 2022 for St Patrick’s Day. The European Union placed the UAE on its money laundering blacklist, in December 2022. It implied that the EU considers the Emirates a high-risk nation that presents “strategic deficiencies in the anti-money laundering countering the financing of terrorism regimes”. The move was taken amid the conflict against the Kinahan Organised Crime Group (KOCG), and was expected to push the authorities to take proactive measures against members of the Kinahan cartel.

United Kingdom
Money laundering and terrorist funding legislation in the UK is governed by six Acts of primary legislation:-
 Terrorism Act 2000
 Anti-terrorism, Crime and Security Act 2001
 Proceeds of Crime Act 2002
 Serious Organised Crime and Police Act 2005
 Criminal Finances Act 2017
 Sanctions and Anti-Money Laundering Act 2018

Money Laundering Regulations are designed to protect the UK financial system, as well as preventing and detecting crime. If a business is covered by these regulations then controls are put in place to prevent it being used for money laundering.

The Proceeds of Crime Act 2002 contains the primary UK anti-money laundering legislation, including provisions requiring businesses within the "regulated sector" (banking, investment, money transmission, certain professions, etc.) to report to the authorities suspicions of money laundering by customers or others.

Money laundering is broadly defined in the UK. In effect any handling or involvement with any proceeds of any crime (or monies or assets representing the proceeds of crime) can be a money laundering offence. An offender's possession of the proceeds of his own crime falls within the UK definition of money laundering. The definition also covers activities within the traditional definition of money laundering, as a process that conceals or disguises the proceeds of crime to make them appear legitimate.

Unlike certain other jurisdictions (notably the US and much of Europe), UK money laundering offences are not limited to the proceeds of serious crimes, nor are there any monetary limits. Financial transactions need no money laundering design or purpose for UK laws to consider them a money laundering offence. A money laundering offence under UK legislation need not even involve money, since the money laundering legislation covers assets of any description. In consequence, any person who commits an acquisitive crime (i.e., one that produces some benefit in the form of money or an asset of any description) in the UK inevitably also commits a money laundering offence under UK legislation.

This applies also to a person who, by criminal conduct, evades a liability (such as a taxation liability)—which lawyers call "obtaining a pecuniary advantage"—as he is deemed thereby to obtain a sum of money equal in value to the liability evaded.

The principal money laundering offences carry a maximum penalty of 14 years' imprisonment.

Secondary regulation is provided by the Money Laundering Regulations 2003, which were replaced by the Money Laundering Regulations 2007. They are directly based on the EU Directives 91/308/EEC, 2001/97/EC and (through the 2007 regulations) 2005/60/EC. The regulations list a number of supervisory authorities who have a role in overseeing the financial activities of their members.

One consequence of the Act is that solicitors, accountants, tax advisers, and insolvency practitioners who suspect (as a consequence of information received in the course of their work) that their clients (or others) have engaged in tax evasion or other criminal conduct that produced a benefit, now must report their suspicions to the authorities (since these entail suspicions of money laundering). In most circumstances it would be an offence, "tipping-off", for the reporter to inform the subject of his report that a report has been made. These provisions do not however require disclosure to the authorities of information received by certain professionals in privileged circumstances or where the information is subject to legal professional privilege. Others that are subject to these regulations include financial institutions, credit institutions, estate agents (which includes chartered surveyors), trust and company service providers, high value dealers (who accept cash equivalent to €15,000 or more for goods sold), and casinos.

Professional guidance (which is submitted to and approved by the UK Treasury) is provided by industry groups including the Joint Money Laundering Steering Group, the Law Society. and the Consultative Committee of Accountancy Bodies (CCAB).
However, there is no obligation on banking institutions to routinely report monetary deposits or transfers above a specified value. Instead reports must be made of all suspicious deposits or transfers, irrespective of their value.

The reporting obligations include reporting suspicious gains from conduct in other countries that would be criminal if it took place in the UK. Exceptions were later added for certain activities legal where they took place, such as bullfighting in Spain.

More than 200,000 reports of suspected money laundering are submitted annually to authorities in the UK (there were 240,582 reports in the year ended 30 September 2010. This was an increase from the 228,834 reports submitted in the previous year). Most of these reports are submitted by banks and similar financial institutions (there were 186,897 reports from the banking sector in the year ended 30 September 2010).

Although 5,108 different organisations submitted suspicious activity reports to the authorities in the year ended 30 September 2010, just four organisations submitted approximately half of all reports, and the top 20 reporting organisations accounted for three-quarters of all reports.

The offence of failing to report a suspicion of money laundering by another person carries a maximum penalty of five years' imprisonment.

The Criminal Finances Act 2017 introduced unexplained wealth orders, another tool to combat money laundering, whereby the owner of an asset greater than £50,000 may be required to show how the purchase was financed.

On 1 May 2018, the UK House of Commons, without opposition, passed the Sanctions and Anti-Money Laundering Bill, which will set out the UK government's intended approach to exceptions and licenses when the nation becomes responsible for implementing its own sanctions and will also require notorious overseas British territory tax havens such as the Cayman Islands and the British Virgin Islands to establish public registers of the beneficial ownership of firms in their jurisdictions by the end of 2020.  The legislation was passed by the House of Lords on 21 May and received Royal Asset on 23 May.  However, the Act's public register provision is facing legal challenges from local governments in the Cayman Islands and British Virgin Islands, who argue that it violates their Constitutional sovereignty.

Under the Proceeds of Crime Act goods that criminals cannot legally account for are seized and sold at auction to raise funds. This is usually carried out by authorised auction houses and often within the geographical areas of the criminals.

Bureaux de change
All UK Bureaux de change are registered with His Majesty's Revenue and Customs, which issues a trading licence for each location. Bureaux de change and money transmitters, such as Western Union outlets, in the UK fall within the "regulated sector" and are required to comply with the Money Laundering Regulations 2007. Checks can be carried out by HMRC on all Money Service Businesses.

London Bullion Market Association
In November 2020, the London Bullion Market Association wrote a letter to a number of countries with huge gold markets, including Dubai (United Arab Emirates), China, Singapore, South Africa, Russia, Japan, United States and others, laying out the standards regarding money laundering and other issues like where they sourced their gold. It also threatened that these countries could be blacklisted, if they failed to meet the regulatory standards. This was LBMA’s first move to challenge the illegal or unethical production and trading of gold.

Ernst & Young Global Limited
A former partner of the UK-based accounting firm Ernst & Young, Amjad Rihan was ousted after he attempted to report the money laundering and gold smuggling efforts of Dubai-based firm Kaloti Jewellery International. Rihan had claimed that “Kaloti was knowingly dealing in gold bullion smuggled out of Morocco”. However, after he reported the issue, the Dubai government body, DMCC, attempted to put unnecessary pressure on him and his firm. In 2021, Ernst & Young withdrew an eight-year-long legal fight against Rihan asking a compensation of $10.8 million from him.

United States
The approach in the United States to stopping money laundering is usually broken into two areas: preventive (regulatory) measures and criminal measures.

Preventive
In an attempt to prevent dirty money from entering the U.S. financial system in the first place, the United States Congress passed a series of laws, starting in 1970, collectively known as the Bank Secrecy Act (BSA). These laws, contained in sections 5311 through 5332 of Title 31 of the United States Code, require financial institutions, which under the current definition include a broad array of entities, including banks, credit card companies, life insurers, money service businesses and broker-dealers in securities, to report certain transactions to the United States Department of the Treasury. Cash transactions in excess of a certain amount must be reported on a currency transaction report (CTR), identifying the individual making the transaction as well as the source of the cash. The law originally required all transactions of US$5,000 or more to be reported, but due to excessively high levels of reporting the threshold was raised to US$10,000.  The U.S. is one of the few countries in the world to require reporting of all cash transactions over a certain limit, although certain businesses can be exempt from the requirement. Additionally, financial institutions must report transaction on a Suspicious Activity Report (SAR) that they deem "suspicious", defined as a knowing or suspecting that the funds come from illegal activity or disguise funds from illegal activity, that it is structured to evade BSA requirements or appears to serve no known business or apparent lawful purpose; or that the institution is being used to facilitate criminal activity. Attempts by customers to circumvent the BSA, generally by structuring cash deposits to amounts lower than US$10,000 by breaking them up and depositing them on different days or at different locations also violates the law.

The financial database created by these reports is administered by the U.S.'s Financial Intelligence Unit (FIU), called the Financial Crimes Enforcement Network (FinCEN), located in Vienna, Virginia. The reports are made available to U.S. criminal investigators, as well as other FIU's around the globe, and FinCEN conducts computer assisted analyses of these reports to determine trends and refer investigations.

The BSA requires financial institutions to engage in customer due diligence, or KYC, which is sometimes known in parlance as know your customer. It includes obtaining satisfactory identification to assure that the account is in the customer's actual name and understanding the expected nature and source of the money that flows through the customer's accounts. Other customers, such as those with private banking accounts and those of foreign government officials, are subjected to enhanced due diligence because the law deems that those accounts are at a higher risk for money laundering. All accounts are subject to ongoing monitoring, in which internal bank software scrutinizes transactions and flags for manual inspection those that fall outside specific parameters. If a manual inspection reveals that the transaction is suspicious, the institution should file a Suspicious Activity Report.

The regulators of the industries involved are responsible to ensure that the financial institutions comply with the BSA. For example, the Federal Reserve and the Office of the Comptroller of the Currency regularly inspect banks, and may impose civil fines or refer matters for criminal prosecution for non-compliance. A number of banks have been fined and prosecuted for failure to comply with the BSA. Most famously, Riggs Bank, in Washington D.C., was prosecuted and functionally driven out of business as a result of its failure to apply proper money laundering controls, particularly as it related to foreign political figures.

In addition to the BSA, the U.S. imposes controls on the movement of currency across its borders, requiring individuals to report the transportation of cash in excess of US$10,000 on a form called Report of International Transportation of Currency or Monetary Instruments (known as a CMIR). Likewise, businesses, such as automobile dealerships, that receive cash in excess of US$10,000 must file a Form 8300 with the Internal Revenue Service, identifying the source of the cash.

On 1 September 2010, the Financial Crimes Enforcement Network issued an advisory on "informal value transfer systems" referencing United States v. Banki.

In the United States, there are perceived consequences of anti-money laundering (AML) regulations. These unintended consequences include FinCEN's publishing of a list of "risky businesses", which many believe unfairly targeted money service businesses. The publishing of this list and the subsequent fall-out, banks indiscriminately de-risking MSBs, is referred to as Operation Choke Point. The Financial Crimes Enforcement Network issued a Geographic Targeting Order to combat against illegal money laundering in the United States. This means that title insurance companies in the U.S. are required to identify the natural persons behind companies that pay all cash in residential real estate purchases over a particular amount in certain U.S. cities.

Criminal sanctions
Money laundering has been criminalized in the United States since the Money Laundering Control Act of 1986. The law, contained at section 1956 of Title 18 of the United States Code, prohibits individuals from engaging in a financial transaction with proceeds that were generated from certain specific crimes, known as "specified unlawful activities" (SUAs). The law requires that an individual specifically intend in making the transaction to conceal the source, ownership or control of the funds. There is no minimum threshold of money, and no requirement that the transaction succeeded in actually disguising the money. A "financial transaction" has been broadly defined, and need not involve a financial institution, or even a business. Merely passing money from one person to another, with the intent to disguise the source, ownership, location or control of the money, has been deemed a financial transaction under the law. The possession of money without either a financial transaction or an intent to conceal is not a crime in the United States. Besides money laundering, the law contained in section 1957 of Title 18 of the United States Code, prohibits spending more than US$10,000 derived from an SUA, regardless of whether the individual wishes to disguise it. It carries a lesser penalty than money laundering, and unlike the money laundering statute, requires that the money pass through a financial institution.

According to the records compiled by the United States Sentencing Commission, in 2009, the United States Department of Justice typically convicted a little over 81,000 people; of this, approximately 800 are convicted of money laundering as the primary or most serious charge.
The Anti-Drug Abuse Act of 1988 expanded the definition of financial institution to include businesses such as car dealers and real estate closing personnel and required them to file reports on large currency transaction. It required verification of identity of those who purchase monetary instruments over $3,000. The Annunzio-Wylie Anti-Money Laundering Act of 1992 strengthened sanctions for BSA violations, required so called "Suspicious Activity Reports" and eliminated previously used "Criminal Referral Forms", required verification and recordkeeping for wire transfers and established the Bank Secrecy Act Advisory Group (BSAAG). The Money Laundering Suppression Act from 1994 required banking agencies to review and enhance training, develop anti-money laundering examination procedures, review and enhance procedures for referring cases to law enforcement agencies, streamlined the currency transaction report exemption process, required each money services business (MSB) to be registered by an owner or controlling person, required every MSB to maintain a list of businesses authorized to act as agents in connection with the financial services offered by the MSB, made operating an unregistered MSB a federal crime, and recommended that states adopt uniform laws applicable to MSBs. The Money Laundering and Financial Crimes Strategy Act of 1998 required banking agencies to develop anti-money laundering training for examiners, required the Department of the Treasury and other agencies to develop a "National Money Laundering Strategy", created the "High Intensity Money Laundering and Related Financial Crime Area" (HIFCA) Task Forces to concentrate law enforcement efforts at the federal, state and local levels in zones where money laundering is prevalent. HIFCA zones may be defined geographically or can be created to address money laundering in an industry sector, a financial institution, or group of financial institutions.

The Intelligence Reform & Terrorism Prevention Act of 2004 amended the Bank Secrecy Act to require the Secretary of the Treasury to prescribe regulations requiring certain financial institutions to report cross-border electronic transmittals of funds, if the Secretary determines that reporting is "reasonably necessary" in "anti-money laundering /combatting financing of terrorists (Anti-Money Laundering/Combating the Financing of Terrorism AML/CFT)."

Notable cases

 Bank of Credit and Commerce International: Unknown amount, estimated in billions, of criminal proceeds, including drug trafficking money, laundered during the mid-1980s.
 Bank of New York: US$7 billion of Russian capital flight laundered through accounts controlled by bank executives, late 1990s.
 BNP Paribas, in June 2014, pleaded guilty to falsifying business records and conspiracy, having violated U.S. sanctions against Cuba, Iran, and Sudan. It agreed to pay an $8.9 billion fine, the largest ever for violating U.S. sanctions.
 BSI Bank, in May 2017, was shut down by the Monetary Authority of Singapore for serious breaches of anti-money laundering requirements, poor management oversight of the bank's operations, and gross misconduct of some of the bank's staff.
 BTA Bank: $6 billion of bank funds embezzled or fraudulently loaned to shell companies and offshore holdings by the banks former chairman and CEO Mukhtar Ablyazov.
 Charter House Bank: Charter House Bank in Kenya was placed under statutory management in 2006 by the Central Bank of Kenya after it was discovered the bank was being used for money laundering activities by multiple accounts containing missing customer information. More than $1.5 billion had been laundered before the scam was uncovered.
 Danske Bank + Swedbank: $30 billion – $230 billion US dollars laundered through its Estonian branch. This was revealed on 19 September 2018. Investigations by Denmark, Estonia, the U.K. and the U.S. were joined by France in February 2019. On 19 February 2019, Danske Bank announced that it would cease operating in Russia and the Baltic States. This statement came shortly after Estonia's banking regulator Finantsinspektsioon announced that they would close the Estonian branch of Danske Bank. The investigation has grown to include Swedbank, which may have laundered $4.3 billion. More at Danske Bank money laundering scandal.
 Deutsche Bank was accused in a vast money laundering scheme, dubbed the Global Laundromat, involving secret Russian accounts that were transferred from European Union banks in Estonia, Latvia and Cyprus between 2010 and 2014. Newspaper sources estimated the total value of laundered currency to be as high as $80bn. The bank is also under investigation for its involvement in Europe's biggest banking scandal through Denmark's Danske Bank, which laundered €200bn, also from Russian sources.
 United Arab Emirates’ Dubai Islamic Bank was accused of “knowingly and purposefully” providing “financial services and other forms of material support to al-Qaeda operatives” when the terrorist group was planning the execution of the September 11 attacks against the United States. In addition, the Sharjah branch of Standard Chartered Bank was also involved in opening the accounts of the terror operatives and allowing financial transactions to take place between them and Khalid Sheikh Mohammed, “the principal architect of the 9/11 attacks”.
 FinCEN Files: On 21 September 2020, The International Consortium of Investigative Journalists (ICIJ) revealed FinCEN Files, about the involvement of about $2tn of transactions by some of the world's biggest banks. FinCEN files also revealed that Dubai-based Gunes General Trading, based in Dubai funneled Iranian state money via UAE's central banking system and processed $142 million in 2011 and 2012.
 Fortnite. In 2018 Cybersecurity firm Sixgill posed as customers and discovered that stolen credit card details may be used to purchase Fortnite's in-game currency (V-Bucks) then in-game purchases, to be sold for "clean" money. Epic Games, the makers of Fortnite, responded by urging customers to secure their accounts.
 HSBC, in December 2012, paid a record $1.9 Billion fines for money-laundering hundreds of millions of dollars for drug traffickers, terrorists and sanctioned governments such as Iran. The money-laundering occurred throughout the 2000s.
 Institute for the Works of Religion: Italian authorities investigated suspected money laundering transactions amounting to US$218 million made by the IOR to several Italian banks.  
 Liberty Reserve, in May 2013, was seized by United States federal authorities for laundering $6 billion.
 Nauru: US$70 billion of Russian capital flight laundered through unregulated Nauru offshore shell banks, late 1990s
 Sani Abacha: US$2–5 billion of government assets laundered through banks in the UK, Luxembourg, Jersey (Channel Islands), and Switzerland, by the president of Nigeria.
 Standard Bank: Standard Bank South Africa London Branch – The Financial Conduct Authority (FCA) has fined Standard Bank PLC (Standard Bank) £7,640,400 for failings relating to its anti-money laundering (AML) policies and procedures over corporate and private bank customers connected to politically exposed persons (PEPs).
 Standard Chartered: paid $330 million in fines for money-laundering hundreds of billions of dollars for Iran. The money-laundering took place in the 2000s and occurred for "nearly a decade to hide 60,000 transactions worth $250 billion".
 Westpac: On 24 September 2020, Westpac and AUSTRAC agreed to a AUD $1.3 billion penalty over Westpac's breaches of the Anti-Money Laundering and Counter-Terrorism Financing Act 2006 - the largest fine ever issued in Australian corporate history.

Individuals
Jose Franklin Jurado-Rodriguez, a Harvard College and Columbia University Graduate School of Arts and Sciences Economics Department alumnus, was convicted in Luxembourg in June 1990 "in what was one of the largest drug money laundering cases ever brought in Europe" and the US in 1996 of money laundering for the Cali Cartel kingpin Jose Santacruz Londono. Jurado-Rodriguez specialized in "smurfing".
 Ng Lap Seng: The Chinese billionaire real estate developer from Macau was sentenced to four years in prison in May 2018 for bribing two diplomats, including former president of the United Nations General Assembly, John William Ashe, to help him build a conference center in Macau for the United Nations Office for South-South Cooperation (UNOSSC), headed by Director Yiping Zhou. The corruption case was the worst financial scandal for the United Nations since the abuse of the Iraqi oil-for-food program more than 20 years ago. Ng Lap Seng, 69, was convicted in Federal District Court in Manhattan on two counts of violating the Foreign Corrupt Practices Act, one count of paying bribes, one count of money laundering, and two counts of conspiracy.
 Ferdinand Marcos: Unknown amount, estimated at US$10 billion of government assets laundered through banks and financial institutions in the United States, Liechtenstein, Austria, Panama, Netherlands Antilles, Cayman Islands, Vanuatu, Hong Kong, Singapore, Monaco, the Bahamas, the Vatican and Switzerland.

See also

 2011 Iranian embezzlement scandal
 Allen Stanford
 Avo Viiol
 Azerbaijani laundromat
 Bank Secrecy Act
 Charles Ponzi
 Confiscation
 Corruption charges against Suharto
 Currency transaction report
 Customer Identification Program
 Danske Bank money laundering scandal
 Defalcation
 Embezzlement
 FBI
 Financial Action Task Force on Money Laundering
 Financial Crimes Enforcement Network
 FinCEN Files
 Gold laundering
 Graft (politics)
 Harriette Walters
 Hawala
 Michael H. O'Keefe
 Money trail
 Mukhtar Ablyazov
 Office of Foreign Assets Control
 Offshore banking
 Organized crime
 Operation Greenback
 Penny stock scam
 Politically exposed person
 Reputation laundering
 Round-tripping (finance)
 Russian Laundromat
 Scott W. Rothstein
 Sholam Weiss
 Shell (corporation)
 Sponsorship scandal
 Terrorist financing
 The Establishment
 The Route of the K-Money
 Tom Petters
 Toni Musulin
 USA PATRIOT Act
 White-collar crime
 World Bank residual model
 Wood laundering

References

External links

 
 UNODC on money-laundering and countering the financing of terrorism: profile from the United Nations Office on Drugs and Crime
 Financial Market Integrity Unit of the World Bank
 International Narcotics Control Strategy Report (INCSR), annual report issued by the United States Department of State in March every year (prepared by Bureau of International Narcotics and Law Enforcement Affairs) on country money laundering risk

 
Commercial crimes
Financial regulation
Tax evasion
Cover-ups
Organized crime
Funding of terrorism